Tahiti Nui TV, abbreviated as TNTV, is a French Polynesian television channel.

Programming
See: List of programs broadcast by Tahiti Nui Television

TNTV airs three news providing TV shows, Te ve'a, The Journal and Manihini.

References

External links

TNTV Replay

See also
List of programs broadcast by Tahiti Nui Television

Mass media in French Polynesia
Television networks in France